Eupithecia quadripunctata is a moth in the family Geometridae. It is found in India, Pakistan, Nepal, Russia, China (Shanxi, Shaanxi, Gansu, Hebei, Henan, Heilongjiang), Taiwan, Korea, Japan and northern Thailand.

There are two generations per year. The aestival brood is much smaller than the vernal brood.

References

 , 2008, A survey of the Eupithecia fauna (Lepidoptera: Geometridae) of the Western Himalayas: Part 2, Transactions of the Lepidopterological Society of Japan 59 (2): 117-143.
 , 2009: A survey of the genus Eupithecia (Lepidoptera, Geometridae) in mainland South East Asia: Part II. Transactions of the Lepidopterological Society of Japan 60(3): 167-188. Abstract: .

Moths described in 1888
quadripunctata
Moths of Asia